Justice Harding may refer to:

Major B. Harding, chief justice of the Supreme Court of Florida
Stephen S. Harding, chief justice of the Colorado Supreme Court